Luke MacDougall (born 5 February 1982) is an Australian former professional rugby league footballer in the National Rugby League competition, who last played for the Canterbury-Bankstown Bulldogs. He previously played for the Cronulla-Sutherland Sharks, South Sydney Rabbitohs, St. George Illawarra Dragons, Newcastle Knights and the Melbourne Storm.

Background
MacDougall was born in Sydney, New South Wales, Australia.

MacDougall is the youngest brother of Australian Kangaroos and State of Origin representative Adam MacDougall, former rugby league and Scottish rugby union player, Ben MacDougall and son of former NRL player Gil MacDougall.

Playing career
MacDougall made his first grade debut for Cronulla-Sutherland in round 4 of the 2002 NRL season against the Brisbane Broncos scoring a try in a 18–16 loss.  MacDougall made a total of seven appearances in his debut year and scored four tries.

In 2003, MacDougall joined South Sydney.  MacDougall played for Souths during a difficult period in their history where the club finished last in 2003, 2004 and 2006.
During the 2005 NRL season, MacDougall was suspended for ten matches after performing a dangerous tackle on Sydney Roosters player Anthony Minichiello.

In 2007, MacDougall joined St. George Illawarra but only managed to play four games before being released to join Newcastle mid-season.  In 2010, he signed with Melbourne and played for them during a year in which the club had two premierships stripped from them and were forced to play for no points after the NRL discovered the club had deliberately breached the salary cap between 2006 and 2010.

MacDougall joined Canterbury-Bankstown full-time NRL squad in 2012.  He only featured in two games for Canterbury and did not play in the 2012 NRL Grand Final defeat by his former club Melbourne.

Career highlights
First Grade Debut: 2002 - round 4, Cronulla-Sutherland vs Brisbane Broncos at ANZ Stadium, 7 April

Retirement
MacDougall decided to retire from rugby league at the end of the 2012 NRL season.

References

External links
Melbourne Storm profile
NRL Player Profile

1982 births
Living people
Australian rugby league players
Australian people of Scottish descent
Cronulla-Sutherland Sharks players
South Sydney Rabbitohs players
St. George Illawarra Dragons players
Newcastle Knights players
Melbourne Storm players
Canterbury-Bankstown Bulldogs players
Lakes United Seagulls players
Rugby league wingers
Rugby league players from Sydney
Luke